In investments, uncompensated risk is the level of additional risk for which no additional returns are generated and when taking systematic withdrawals make the probability of failure unacceptably high. Uncompensated risk is reduced by diversifying investment.

References

Investment